Pindi Bahauddin also known as Pindi Purani is a village and union council of Mandi Bahauddin District in the Punjab province of Pakistan. It is located at 32°36'0N 73°28'60E and has an altitude of 217 metres (715 feet).

References

Union councils of Mandi Bahauddin District
Villages in Mandi Bahauddin District